This is a list of organisations directly affiliated with the Association of Southeast Asian Nations, or ASEAN.

Organisations under the jurisdiction of ASEAN

External links
 ASEAN official site
 ASEAN official site, Directory

 
ASEAN